Relations between RDC and France are bilateral diplomatic relations between the Democratic Republic of the Congo and France. The Democratic Republic of the Congo has an embassy in Paris. France has an embassy in Kinshasa.

History 

In 1961, France sent colonel Roger Trinquier to support the coup d'etat of Mobutu Sese Seko.

Valéry Giscard d'Estaing decided to send the French Army to Zaïre in 1977 to help Mobutu, whose régime threatened to crumble before rebels of the Congolese National Liberation Front in the Shaba I war. France intervened again the following year in the Shaba II war.

In the 1994 Rwandan genocide, Mobutu Sese Seko authorized France to use the Kivu region as a base for Operation Turquoise, a French military operation to put an end to the massacres in Rwanda.

Contemporary period

Culture 
French is the official language of Congo-DRC, and both France and the DRC are full members of the Organisation internationale de la francophonie (International Organization of French Speakers).

Several Alliances françaises and Instituts français operate in the RDC (notably the Institut français in Kinshasa), as well as the lycée Français René Descartes de Kinshasa. France has also trained certain Congolese administrators at the École Nationale d'Administration.

Politics 
France committed at the end of President Kabila's second to the European Union  and the United Nations Security Council that it would enforce human rights, ldemocracy and the Congolese constitution.

France provides Congo-DRC with food and medical assistance. French food aid has increased since the food crisis of 2008, reaching 17 million euros between 2008 and 2012.

Economic relations 
France primarily imports food and agricultural products from the DRC, whose primary imports from France are pharmaceuticals and mechanical equipment.

The DRC receives support from French experts to help it improve its budgetary and administrative performance, in accordance with the debt reduction and development contract (C2D) between the two countries.

See also 
 Foreign relations of Democratic Republic of the Congo
 Foreign relations of France
 Belgium–Democratic Republic of the Congo relations

Notes and references 

Democratic Republic of the Congo–France relations